A voiced bilabial implosive is a type of consonantal sound, used in some spoken languages.

Features
Features of the voiced bilabial implosive:

Occurrence

See also
 Index of phonetics articles
 Voiceless bilabial implosive
 B̤ē

Notes

References

External links 
 

Bilabial consonants
Implosives
Voiced oral consonants